Euclid Avenue station is a station on the Orange Line of the San Diego Trolley located in the Emerald Hills neighborhood of San Diego, California. The station serves both nearby residences and is also a park and ride facility.

History
Euclid Avenue opened as the original eastern terminus of the Euclid Line, the second original line of the San Diego Trolley system, on March 23, 1986.

This station was renovated from June 2012 through fall 2012 as part of the Trolley Renewal Project, although the station remained open during construction.

Station layout
There are two tracks, each served by a side platform.

See also
 List of San Diego Trolley stations

References

Orange Line (San Diego Trolley)
San Diego Trolley stations in San Diego
Railway stations in the United States opened in 1986
1986 establishments in California